Daniel Pitout, known professionally as Orville Peck, is a South African country musician based in Canada. He wears a fringed mask and has never shown his face publicly. He released his debut album Pony in 2019, followed by the EP Show Pony the next year. His second studio album Bronco was released on April 8, 2022.

Early life 
Peck was born in Johannesburg, South Africa and lived there until he was 15. As a child, Peck taught himself music by playing on an acoustic guitar and an old Casio keyboard. He is the son of a sound engineer, and he did voice-over work for cartoons and other media as a child. Growing up, he trained in ballet for 12 years, and performed in musical theatre. By the time he was in his early 20s, Peck had been on national tours of musicals.

In his mid-20s, he moved to London to study acting at the London Academy of Music and Dramatic Art, and later starred in a play on the West End.

Career 
"Orville Peck" is a pseudonym; he has been described as "presumably older than 20 and younger than 40".

Peck self-produced his debut album, Pony, and released it in 2019 through a collaboration with Sub Pop. He has noted that he "wrote, produced and played every instrument he could" on the album while working in a coffee shop and living with his parents. In June of that year, he performed his songs "Dead of Night" and "Take You Back" live on CBC Radio One's Q. Pony was named to the initial longlist for the 2019 Polaris Music Prize in June 2019. The album also received a Juno Award nomination for Alternative Album of the Year at the Juno Awards of 2020.

Peck performed "Dead of Night" on Jimmy Kimmel Live on January 29, 2020. He also announced a tour of selected cities in the United States, including performances at the Coachella and Stagecoach festivals.

In May 2020, Peck announced the follow-up to his debut album, an EP titled Show Pony, with a release date of June 12, 2020. In July, 2020, Peck announced the delayed release of Show Pony until August 14, 2020, in recognition of the Black Lives Matter movement and the ongoing protests against police brutality in the United States.

Peck recorded a cover of "Smalltown Boy" for the 2020 Pride edition of the Spotify Singles series. The song was released exclusively on Spotify on June 29, 2020, and everywhere else on July 31, 2020.

In April 2021, Peck was featured on American drag queen and singer Trixie Mattel's EP, Full Coverage, Vol. 1. He appeared on the song "Jackson", a duet cover of Johnny Cash and June Carter Cash's "Jackson." In June, he was revealed to be the sixth artist on Lady Gaga's Born This Way The Tenth Anniversary, with Peck reimagining the song "Born This Way" in a country style. On March 16, 2023, Peck made an appearance as a guest on the judge's panel on MTV's RuPaul's Drag Race, alongside RuPaul Charles, Michelle Visage, and Ross Mathews.

Artistry

Identity
It has been confirmed that Orville Peck is a persona of Daniel Pitout, drummer of the Canadian punk band Nü Sensae. Previously it had been speculated that Pitout was Peck based on the similarity of Peck's tattoos, as well as Peck mentioning that he was in a punk band. Pitout was born in Johannesburg, South Africa, as was Peck. Pitout also starred as a replacement in Peter Pan Goes Wrong in the West End in 2016, which lines up with Peck mentioning he was in a West End play while he lived in London. Pitout is also listed by ASCAP as the songwriter for Peck's song "Old River" and other songs that match the titles of the songs released by Peck, such as "Roses Are Falling".

Influences

Peck strongly identifies with 1970s era country music and lists classic stars Waylon Jennings, George Jones, Tammy Wynette, Johnny Cash, Willie Nelson, Gram Parsons, Emmylou Harris, Bobbie Gentry, Reba McEntire and Dolly Parton as influences. Of Parton, he explained that: “when I first discovered her, I thought that she was like a character; I didn't really know that she was a real person making music. That's the beauty of that age of country music that inspires me – these heightened versions of yourself so it's really sincere on one hand and on [the other] hand it's larger-than-life, but it's nice that those things can live side-by-side.” Peck states that Merle Haggard is his favorite artist of that time, as he connected to Haggard's openness in his songwriting despite his reserved nature, explaining: “He holds back a lot, but by doing that I think he revealed a lot. I'm not a very open person naturally, but I think that sincerity has come through my music and my lyrics because I find it very hard to be open in everyday life.” Outside of country music, Peck has mentioned Roy Orbison, Oasis, Whitney Houston and Lana Del Rey and film directors David Lynch and John Waters as influences.

When discussing his debut album Pony, Peck listed albums by Cash, Jefferson Airplane, X, Parton, Patti Smith, Haggard, Descendents, Neil Young, Sonic Youth and Orbison as influences on his sound. While promoting his duet "Legends Never Die", Peck highlighted the significance that the music of Shania Twain has had on him, explaining “she has always been a hero of mine and her music made me feel so empowered growing up.”

For his second album, Bronco, Peck noted the influence of 60s and 70s psychedelic rock, specifically mentioning bands Jefferson Airplane, The Mamas & the Papas, Pink Floyd and Syd Barrett and South African folk artists Miriam Makeba and Hugh Masekela alongside the "flower child" country influences of Parsons, Harris, Haggard and Nelson.

Personal life 
Peck is gay. Regarding his reasons for wearing a mask to perform, Peck has stated that "the only reason I don't talk about it in depth is not because I want to dodge any questions, but because I want people to have their own take on it. I don't want to lay it out and pin it down. I just don't think that's important." Regarding his nationality, he stated in 2022 that "[e]veryone thinks I'm Canadian because I lived in Canada for a long time, but I'm not. I was born in South Africa—I grew up in Johannesburg until I was 15. I never talked about where I was from only because I wanted to wait—obviously, I'm a man of mystery and I like to not give everyone everything all at once... I'm so proud to be South African. I go back there all the time."

Awards and honors 

In June 2020, in honor of the 50th anniversary of the first LGBTQ Pride parade, Queerty named him among the fifty heroes "leading the nation toward equality, acceptance, and dignity for all people".

In June 2022, Peck was presented with the Cultural Icon Award by the Tom of Finland Foundation, "for artistic achievement and immeasurable contributions to the art and culture of our community", an award previously presented to Rob Halford, Henry Rollins, Clive Barker and John Waters.

Discography

Studio albums

Extended plays

Singles

As lead artist

As featured artist

Music videos

Filmography

Television

Notes

References 

Living people
South African country singer-songwriters
South African country guitarists
South African alternative country singers
South African alternative rock musicians
South African LGBT singers
South African male singer-songwriters
South African gay musicians
Masked musicians
Sub Pop artists
Columbia Records artists
21st-century South African male singers
21st-century Canadian guitarists
Alumni of the London Academy of Music and Dramatic Art
20th-century LGBT people
21st-century LGBT people
Year of birth missing (living people)